A cruiseferry is a ship that combines the features of a cruise ship and a Ro-Pax ferry. Many passengers travel with the ships for the cruise experience, staying only a few hours at the destination port or not leaving the ship at all, while others use the ships as means of transportation.

Cruiseferry traffic is mainly concentrated in the seas of Northern Europe, especially the Baltic Sea and the North Sea. However, similar ships traffic across the English Channel as well as the Irish Sea, Mediterranean and even on the North Atlantic. Cruiseferries also operate from India, China and Australia.

Baltic Sea cruiseferries

In the northern Baltic Sea, two major rival companies, Viking Line and Silja Line, have for decades competed on the routes between Turku and Helsinki in Finland and Sweden's capital Stockholm. Since the 1990s Tallink has also risen as a major company in the area, culminating with acquisition of Silja Line in 2006.

List of largest cruiseferries of their time
The term "cruiseferry" did not come into use until the 1980s, although it has been retroactively applied to earlier ferries that have large cabin capabilities and public spaces in addition to their car- and passenger-carrying capacity.

List of cruiseferry operators

Åland
 Eckerö Linjen
 Viking Line

Australia
 Spirit of Tasmania

Canada
 BC Ferries
 Marine Atlantic

Croatia
 Jadrolinija

Denmark
 DFDS Seaways

Estonia
 Tallink

Faroe Islands
 Smyril Line

Finland
 Eckerö Line
 Silja Line (operated by  Tallink)
 Viking Line
 Finnlines
 Wasa Line

France
 Brittany Ferries
 Corsica Ferries - Sardinia Ferries
 Corsica Linea

Greece
 ANEK Lines
 Blue Star Ferries
 Hellenic Seaways
 LANE Lines
 Levante Ferries
 Minoan Lines
 NEL Lines
 Superfast Ferries
 Ventouris Ferries

Ireland
 Brittany Ferries
 DFDS Seaways
 Irish Ferries
 P&O Ferries
 Stena Line

Italy
 Grandi Navi Veloci
 Grimaldi Lines
 Corsica Ferries
 Moby Lines
 Tirrenia di Navigazione

Mexico
 Baja Ferries

Norway
 Color Line
 Fjord Line

Poland
Polferries

Spain
 Trasmediterranea
 Baleària

Sweden
 Stena Line

United Kingdom
 P&O Ferries
 NorthLink Ferries
 Condor Ferries
 Irish Ferries
 Stena Line

japan
taiheiyou ferry

Gallery

See also

 River cruise

Ship types